Pedaparupudi is a village in Krishna district of the Indian state of Andhra Pradesh. It is the mandal headquarters of Pedaparupudi mandal in Gudivada Revenue Division.

Demographics 

The total 
population constitute,  males,  females and 
 children, in the age group of 0–6 years. The average literacy rate stands at 
79.34% with  literates, significantly higher than the national average of 73.00%.

See also 
Villages in Pedaparupudi mandal

References

Villages in Krishna district
Mandal headquarters in Krishna district